Gistrup is a satellite community just outside Aalborg, Denmark. Gistrup has a population of 3,664 (1 January 2022).

References
 

Cities and towns in the North Jutland Region
Towns and settlements in Aalborg Municipality